Dress Her in Indigo (1969) is the eleventh novel in the Travis McGee series by John D. MacDonald.

Plot synopsis
McGee investigates what happened to a young woman, Beatrice "Bix" Bowie, on behalf of her father, Harlan Bowie, after she disappears into the expatriate subculture of hippies and drug addicts in Oaxaca, Mexico, and is found dead. McGee interacts with several characters to track down the true story of Bix and her four now-missing companions, Walter "Rocko" Rockland, Jerome Nesta, Mindy McLeen, and Carl Saunders. McLeen's father Wally is in Oaxaca on his own search  McGee's sidekick Meyer, a family friend of the Bowies, convinced McGee to investigate, and joins McGee in Mexico.

Theme
The title phrase "Dress Her in Indigo" is found on page 244 of the first edition when one of the characters states, "Look at how splendid that color is for her.  It makes those deep blue eyes look almost deep violet.  I will dress her in indigo, and in the good blues and greens and grays."  This the only book in the series that uses a verb in the title (dress).

References
 
 

1969 American novels
Travis McGee (novel series)
Novels set in Mexico